KONN may refer to:

 KONN-LP, a low-power radio station (100.1 FM) licensed to serve Kansas City, Missouri, United States
 KFCO, a radio station (107.1 FM) licensed to serve Bennett, Colorado, United States, which held the call sign KONN-FM from 2008 to 2009